Ken Roger Lunde (born 12 August 1965 in Madison, Wisconsin) is an American specialist in information processing for East Asian languages.

Academic Background
Ken majored in linguistics at University of Wisconsin–Madison in 1985, where he obtained his Bachelor of Arts degree in 1987, Master of Arts degree in 1988, and graduated with a doctoral thesis on the simplification of Japanese characters in 1994, titled "Prescriptive Kanji Simplification", which was written under the supervision of Professor Andrew Sihler.

Career
Prior to graduation, he joined Adobe Systems on July 1, 1991, where he worked on font development and programming for information processing in CJKV languages; as of 2008, he worked there as a Senior Computer Scientist. He wrote two books on these topics, listed below under Bibliography. A second edition of CJKV Information Processing was published at the end of 2008. His 28-year-long career with Adobe ended on October 18, 2019.

He is a contributor to the Unicode Consortium –formerly as a representative of Adobe (a voting member there)–, specializing in CJK Unified Ideographs; he is the editor (or co-editor) of the Unicode Standard’s Standard Annex #11 “East Asian Width”, Technical Standard #37 “Unicode Ideographic Variation Database”, Standard Annex #38 “Unicode Han Database (Unihan)”, and Standard Annex #50 “Unicode Vertical Text Layout”.

He is also a Unicode representative (as a United States liaison body) at the Ideographic Rapporteur Group, a subgroup of the ISO/IEC JTC 1/SC 2 working group WG2 specializing in Han unification efforts.

In September 2018, Lunde was awarded the Bulldog Award at Internationalization & Unicode Conference 42.

Since 2018 Lunde has been a technical director of the Unicode Consortium and a vice-chair of the Unicode Emoji Subcommittee.

Penname
Ken Lunde chose the penname “Ken Kobayashi” in 1985, a combination of gikun (reading of a kanji by meaning) and ateji (kanji used as phonetic symbol regardless of meaning) concepts. The surname Lunde, of Viking origin, shares the same meaning (“small woods” or “grove”) conveyed by the Japanese surname ; the given name  (and its variant forms like  in Japan's national standard JIS X 0208:1997), chosen both for its phonemic value and for its meaning (“sword”), conveys his fondness for sharp-edged tools like knives.

The traditional form , where  is actually an ideographic variant coined by his wife Hitomi Kudo and accessed with variation selector VS18 as <U+528D,U+E0101> (Adobe-Japan1-4 CID+14106), is penned in UAX #11, UTS #37, UAX #38, and UAX #50; the form  (without the variation selector, matching Traditional Chinese form) was previously used in UAX #38 for Unicode versions 11.0 and earlier. The Japanese simplified form  is currently used in his Adobe business card; he suggested in his 2008 book about using the Simplified Chinese form  when visiting China.

Bibliography
 
  (NB. Translated into Japanese and Chinese in 2002.)
  (translated into Japanese in 1995)

References

External links

 Dr. Ken Lunde: CJK Type Blog

1965 births
Living people
People involved with Unicode
University of Wisconsin–Madison College of Letters and Science alumni